The Borrowers is a children's fantasy novel by the English author Mary Norton, published by Dent in 1952. It features a family of tiny people who live secretly in the walls and floors of an English house and "borrow" from the big people in order to survive. The Borrowers also refers to the series of five novels including The Borrowers and four sequels that feature the same family after they leave "their" house.

The Borrowers won the 1952 Carnegie Medal from the Library Association, recognising the year's outstanding children's book by a British author. In the 70th anniversary celebration of the medal in 2007 it was named one of the top ten Medal-winning works, selected by a panel to compose the ballot for a public election of the all-time favourite.

Harcourt, Brace and Company published it in the U.S. in 1953 with illustrations by Beth and Joe Krush. It was also published in four parts, with illustrations by Erik Blegvad, during the summer of 1953 (June, July, August, September) in Woman's Day magazine. There have been several adaptations of The Borrowers in television and film.

Series

All five Borrowers novels feature the Clock family; Pod, Homily and Arrietty. In the first book they live in a house reportedly based on The Cedars where Norton was raised. The sequels are titled alliteratively and alphabetically: The Borrowers Afield (1955), The Borrowers Afloat (1959), The Borrowers Aloft (1961), and The Borrowers Avenged (1982). All were originally published by J. M. Dent in hardcover editions.
Puffin Books published a 700-page trade paperback omnibus edition in 1983, The Complete Borrowers Stories with a short introduction by Norton.

The primary cause of trouble and source of plot is the interaction between the minuscule Borrowers and the "human beans", whether the human motives are kind or selfish. The main character is teenage Arrietty, who often begins relationships with Big People that have chaotic effects on the lives of herself and her family, causing her parents to react with fear and worry.

The Borrowers are miniature people who live below a clock in a house located in England. Homily, Pod and Arrietty are their names. Pod goes 'Borrowing' for items, Homily does the usual motherhood jobs and Arrietty becomes even more curious about the human being life each and every day.

As a result of Arrietty's curiosity and friendships with Big People, her family are forced to move their home several times from one place to another, making their lives more adventurous than the average Borrower would prefer. After escaping from their home under the kitchen floorboards of an old English manor they finally settle down in the home of a caretaker on the grounds of an old church.

Along the way, they meet more characters: other Borrowers, including a young man around Arrietty's age who lives outdoors and whose only memory of his family is the descriptive phrase, "Dreadful Spiller", which he uses as a name (introduced in The Borrowers Afield), the Harpsichord family who are relatives of the Clock family, and Peregrine ("Peagreen") Overmantel; and also Big People such as Mild Eye the gypsy, Tom Goodenough, the gardener's son, and Miss Menzies, a sweet but overly helpful woman.

The short, separate book Poor Stainless (1966) was revised as a novelette and re-published posthumously with a short author's note in 1994. The narrative, told by Homily to Arrietty, occurs before the first of the full-length Borrower novels, and concerns a small adventure Stainless has when he gets lost. (Like most Borrower names "borrowed" from human objects, Stainless is named after items in the kitchen cutlery drawer.)

Summary of The Borrowers
The story begins with a frame story of young Kate sewing a quilt with her aunt Mrs May. As they stitch the quilt, Kate complains that some of her sewing supplies have gone missing, leading her to wonder where all the small household items that disappear really end up. Mrs May tells Kate about the Borrowers: miniature human-like creatures who live unseen in houses and "borrow" such items from the "human beans" that live there. She goes on to tell the story of how her younger brother once befriended a young Borrower named Arrietty.

Arrietty Clock lives with her parents Pod and Homily under the floor beneath a grandfather clock (Borrowers take their surnames from their living place). One day Pod comes home shaken from a borrowing expedition. After Arrietty goes to bed, Pod tells Homily that he has been seen by a human boy who had been sent from India to live with his great-aunt while recovering from an illness. Remembering the fate of their niece Eggletina, who disappeared after the "human beans" brought a cat into the house, Pod and Homily decide to tell Arrietty. In the course of the ensuing conversation, Homily realizes that Arrietty ought to be allowed to go borrowing with Pod.

Several days later, Pod invites Arrietty to accompany him on a borrowing trip. Since Arrietty has only ever seen the outdoors through a grating, she is allowed to explore the garden, where she meets the Boy. After some trepidation on both their parts, Arrietty and the Boy strike a bargain: the Boy, who is bilingual and slow to learn English, will bring the highly literate Arrietty books if she will read to him. At one point, Arrietty tells the Boy that the world cannot possibly have enough resources to sustain very many humans. He disagrees and tells her that there are millions of people in India alone. Arrietty becomes upset when she realizes she cannot know that there are any Borrowers other than her own family. The Boy offers to take a letter to a badger sett two fields away where her Uncle Hendreary, Aunt Lupy, and their children are supposed to have emigrated.

Meanwhile, Arrietty has learned from Pod and Homily that they get a "feeling" when big people approach. She is concerned that she didn't have a feeling when the Boy approached, so she practices by going to a certain passage below the kitchen, which is more frequently trafficked by humans than the rest of the house. There she overhears the cook Mrs Driver and the gardener Crampfurl discussing the Boy. Mrs Driver dislikes children in general and believes the Boy is up to no good, particularly when Crampfurl suspects that the Boy is keeping a pet ferret after seeing him in a field calling for "Uncle something."

The Boy delivers Arrietty's letter and returns with a mysterious response asking Arrietty to tell Aunt Lupy to come back. Pod catches Arrietty taking the letter from the Boy and brings her home. After Arrietty confesses everything she has told the Boy, Pod and Homily fear the Boy will figure out where they live and that they will be forced to emigrate. The Boy soon does find the Clocks' home, but far from wishing them harm, he brings them gifts of dollhouse furniture from the nursery. They experience a period of "borrowing beyond all dreams of borrowing" as the Boy offers them gift after gift. In return, Arrietty is allowed to go outside and read aloud to him.

Eventually Mrs Driver suspects the Boy of stealing after catching him trying to open a curio cabinet full of valuable miniatures.  One night she finds Arrietty's house from the bright candle light shining through the floorboards. Believing this is where he has been caching his stolen goods, she peers beneath the boards and is horrified to discover the Borrowers in their home. To prevent the Boy from helping the Borrowers escape, she locks him in his room until it is time for him to return to India. Meanwhile, she hires a rat catcher to fumigate the house in order to trap the Borrowers. Mrs Driver cruelly allows the Boy out of his room so that he can watch when the Borrowers' bodies are found. The Boy manages to escape her and, running outside, break open the grating in hopes of providing his friends with an escape route. As he waits for them to emerge, the cab arrives to take him away. Mrs Driver drags him to the cab and forces him inside, leaving the fate of the Borrowers unknown.

Some time later, the Boy's sister (a young Mrs May) visits the home herself in hopes of proving her brother's stories were real. She leaves small gifts at the badgers' sett, which are gone the next time she checks. Later she finds a miniature memoranda book in which the entire story of the Borrowers has been written, presumably by Arrietty. However, when Kate rejoices that the book means that the Borrowers survived and that the whole story was true, Mrs May points out that "Arrietty's" handwriting was identical to Mrs May's brother's.

Characters
Borrowers
 Arrietty Clock: An adventurous and curious fourteen-year-old Borrower. She knows how to read, owns a collection of pocket-sized books, and is fascinated with "human beans" after meeting The Boy. She is also the only Borrower educated enough to comprehend that the Borrowers may be dying out. In later books, her interactions with humans frequently cause concern for her parents.
 Pod Clock: Arrietty's father. A talented Borrower and a shoemaker who creates button boots out of beads and old kid gloves. He is cautious, but not opposed to new ideas, and a quick inventor and improviser. 
 Homily Clock: Arrietty's mother, a nervous woman who likes her tidy domestic world and can't bear the thought of hardship or discomfort. Nevertheless, she often shows fortitude in difficult or dangerous situations, though she complains constantly through them. She is extremely proud of Arrietty and encourages her to educate herself through reading.
 Hendreary Clock: Arrietty's uncle and Pod's brother. He and his family were one of many Borrower families who used to live in the house, but they were eventually forced to leave after Hendreary was "seen." When he finally appears in later books, he is a weary, dispirited man who allows his wife to make all their important decisions.
 Lupy (Rain-Pipe Harpsichord) Clock  – Uncle Hendreary's wife and a distant relation to Homily. Homily dislikes Lupy for putting on airs because she was once a member of the prestigious Harpsichord family, though she envies Lupy's elegance and refinement. She has three sons from a previous marriage and a stepdaughter, Eggletina. She is prissy, bossy, and dominating.
 Eggletina Clock: Hendreary's daughter from his first marriage. Eggletina's family attempted to protect her by lying about the Big House and failed to inform her that her father had been "seen." Unaware of the dangers, Eggletina was also unaware that the "human beans" had brought in a cat. She wandered out to explore and was presumed eaten, though, in the second book, Arrietty learns that she is still alive and that she is a thin, shy girl.
 The Overmantels: A family of Borrowers who lived on the drawing-room mantelpiece, they were snobbish and given to airs, but Homily pities them because they were forced to live on nothing but breakfast food and often went hungry. The Overmantels were one of many Borrower families that emigrated once there were too few humans to sustain them.
 The Rain-Pipes: A family of Borrowers who lived in a drainpipe, they were considered lower-class because their home was prone to flooding, frequently wiping out all their possessions and leaving them destitute. Aunt Lupy was born a Rain-Pipe until she married into the Harpsichord family. Their fate is unknown but presumably they, too, moved away.
 The Harpsichords: Another family of Borrowers who lived in the drawing-room wainscot where a harpsichord used to stand. They mixed with the Overmantels and were likewise prone to putting on airs. Lupy married into the Harpsichord family and had three sons before presumably being left a widow. The Harpsichords had lovely manners but likewise suffered from a lack of food. They too emigrated once the drawing room stopped being used.
 The Bell-Pulls: Homily's parents. It is implied that they died of natural causes between Homily's marriage and Arrietty's early childhood, as Arrietty cannot remember them.
 The Rainbarrels, the Linen-Presses, the Boot-Racks, the Stove-Pipes, the Hon. John Studdingtons: Former Borrower families who once lived in the house. All moved away after their respective areas of the house ceased to be used. (In the case of the Hon. John Studdingtons, they lived behind a portrait of The Boy's great-uncle.)

 Big People
 Kate: A "wild, untidy, self-willed little girl" of 10 years. Kate learns of the Borrowers in the first book. In later books, a slightly older Kate makes a habit of trying to find out more clues of their existence.
 The Boy: A ten-year-old boy sent to recover from an illness at the country home of his great-aunt near Leighton Buzzard. As he was raised in India, he has difficulty reading in English and is often thoughtful and quiet, a trait the servants interpret as "sly" and untrustworthy. He befriends Arrietty and her family.
 Mrs May/Aunt May: Kate's elderly aunt who tells Kate the story of the Borrowers. The Boy was her brother, and as a young woman, she heard his tales of the Borrowers and spent a good deal of time seeking the truth of them. In subsequent books, an adult May inherits a cottage reputed to be the home of more Borrowers.
 Great-Aunt Sophy: The Boy's elderly great-aunt, is an invalid who never comes downstairs. The servants (and the Borrowers) refer to her as "Her." She spends most of her time in bed drinking wine. Pod sometimes comes to visit her while she is drunk, leading her to believe that the Borrowers are a hallucination.
 Mrs Driver: The housekeeper and cook. With Great-Aunt Sophy confined to bed, Mrs Driver is in charge of the whole house. She is grumpy, bossy, gossipy, and resents being required to look after The Boy, whom she dislikes on sight.
 Crampfurl: The gardener and Mrs Driver's crony. He, too, dislikes The Boy based solely on Driver's suspicions.
 Rosa Pickhatchet: A former housemaid who quit after seeing a Borrower.

Themes
 A. N. Wilson considered the work as in part an allegory of post-war Britain – with its picture of a diminished people living in an old, half-empty, decaying “Big House”.

Adaptations
There have been several screen adaptations of The Borrowers:

 The Borrowers: a 1973 American made-for-TV movie in the Hallmark Hall of Fame.
 The Borrowers: a 1992 BBC TV series and its 1993 sequel The Return of the Borrowers, both starring Ian Holm and Penelope Wilton.
 The Borrowers: a 1997 film with a British/American cast including Tom Felton, John Goodman, Jim Broadbent, Celia Imrie and Mark Williams.
 Arrietty: a 2010 Japanese animated film from Studio Ghibli, known as The Secret World of Arrietty in North America.
 The Borrowers: a 2011 BBC production starring Stephen Fry, Victoria Wood, and Christopher Eccleston.
 The Borrowers, a 52-episode animated series currently in production.

See also
 The Littles, a later series by John Peterson, also featuring a family of tiny people
 Eduard Uspensky's Little Warranty People (1975) features tiny people that live in electrical utility devices and provide warranty services for them
 The Nome Trilogy (also called The Bromeliad Trilogy) by Terry Pratchett
 Mistress Masham’s Repose, in which Lilliputians brought back to England by Capt. Gulliver still make their home on an island in the landscape park of a grand English country house.

References

External links 
  – first US edition 
 The Borrowers directory at the Internet Movie Database

 
1952 children's books
1952 British novels
1952 fantasy novels
British children's novels
British fantasy novels
Children's fantasy novels
Fictional humanoids
Low fantasy novels
British novels adapted into television shows
Carnegie Medal in Literature winning works
Novels set in England
J. M. Dent books
British novels adapted into films